Scotts Head may refer to:
Scotts Head, New South Wales, a town in Australia
Scotts Head, Dominica, a village in the south of Dominica